Biju Patnaik International Airport  is an international airport serving Bhubaneswar, the capital city of Odisha. Named after the former chief minister of Odisha, Biju Patnaik, a famed aviator and freedom fighter, it is the 16th busiest airport in India and 11th busiest among the airports maintained by Airports Authority of India, registering an 11.7% fall in traffic over the previous year.

History
The airport was dedicated to the people of Odisha on 17 April 1962, becoming the first ever commercial airport in the state. The airport boasts two active scheduled passenger terminals i.e. Terminals 1 and 2 for domestic and international passengers respectively. Former Minister of Civil Aviation, Ajit Singh, inaugurated Terminal 1 on 5 March 2013, which caters to domestic passengers, whereas Terminal 2 was then refurbished to handle international operations. The Government of India accorded international status to the airport on 30 October 2013. However, it continues to be a domestic airport as it is not yet connected with international destinations.

Terminals
Biju Patnaik Airport serves as one of the major civil aviation hubs in Eastern India. The airport boasts two actively scheduled passenger terminals, i.e. Terminals 1 and 2.

Terminal 1
Inaugurated in March 2013, the terminal has a capacity of 4 million passengers per annum and was built at a cost of  1.45 billion by Lanco Infratech.
The new terminal has been developed by the AAI as part of the upgrade of 35 non-metro airports across the country. Apart from the Departure and Arrival Lounges, Terminal 1 also has several other lounges, including VIP Lounges, Pal Heights Spa Lounge, Dakota Lounge and Mayfair Lounge. The terminal is environment-friendly, built according to green building standards, with sewage treatment plants and provision for rain water harvesting. The internal walls of the terminal are decorated with tribal motifs, designs, masks, and sculptures derived from Odisha's culture. The new terminal also has food kiosks, gift shops, bookstores, art galleries and handloom/handicraft kiosks.

Terminal 2
Terminal 2 handles used to handle international operations in the past, but now handles oy domestic operations to and from the airport. It was built in the mid-1960s to cater domestic flights. A link building connecting Terminal 1 and 2 is being constructed with a budget of 872 million. It will be used for domestic and international arrivals.

Terminal 3
The terminal would handle 8 million passengers per annum, expanding Biju Patnaik International Airport's capacity to 11.5 million from 3.5 million passengers per annum. The construction work for the terminal is poised to begin in July 2019, with a given construction duration of three years. This terminal, once completed, would handle only international passengers, and the existing terminals 1 and 2 would then cater only domestic passengers' departures and arrivals, respectively. Terminal 2 will be used for both domestic and international arrivals.

Coast Guard Air Enclave
The Coast Guard Air Enclave along with the 743 Dornier Squadron was commissioned by former Vice-Admiral Anurag G Thapliyal, Director General of the Indian Coast Guard in Biju Patnaik International Airport on 15 December 2014. 
The units operate under the operational and administrative control of the Commander of the Coast Guard Region (North East) through the Commander, Coast Guard District No 7 (Odisha). Several strategic air operations are streamlined and synergised for the protection of the sea areas off the Coastal Odisha.

Airlines and destinations

Statistics

See also
 Airports in India
 List of busiest airports in India by passenger traffic
 Air Odisha

References

External links

Biju Patnaik International Airport at Airports Authority of India

Buildings and structures in Bhubaneswar
Airports in Odisha
International airports in India
Transport in Bhubaneswar
Memorials to Biju Patnaik
1962 establishments in Orissa
Airports established in 1962
20th-century architecture in India